Amalia Rubin is a westerner who sings in the Tibetan language along with the music from a Tibetan instrument.

She performed in a famous Tibetan restaurant in Beijing and met top-notch Tibetan singer, Kunga Phuntsok.

Her two albums are "Mountains and Deserts" and "Leaving Home",  are composed of traditional Tibetan songs. She has performed in 30 different concerts with other Tibetan artists from all over the world from New York City (USA) to Dharamsala (India).

She is the recipient of Best International Artiste for Tibet in Dharamsala, India.

She graduated from Buffalo University, New York, between 2006 and 2008.

References

21st-century Tibetan women singers
Living people
Tibetan-language singers
Year of birth missing (living people)